Eduardo Rodrigues dos Santos de Deus Junior (born 8 October 1995) is a Brazilian specialising in the high hurdles. He won a bronze medal at the 2019 Pan American Games.

His personal bests are 13.27 seconds in the 110 metres hurdles (+0.7 m/s, São Paulo 2022) and 7.72 seconds in the 60 metres hurdles (Cascavel 2022).

He qualified to represent Brazil at the 2020 Summer Olympics.

Personal bests
110 m hurdles: 13.27 (wind: +0.7 m/s) –  São Paulo, 27 Apr 2022
60 m hurdles (indoor): 7.72 –  Cascavel, 12 Feb 2022

All information from World Athletics profile.

International competitions

1Did not finish in the final

References

1995 births
Living people
Brazilian male hurdlers
Athletes (track and field) at the 2019 Pan American Games
Pan American Games athletes for Brazil
Pan American Games medalists in athletics (track and field)
Pan American Games bronze medalists for Brazil
Medalists at the 2019 Pan American Games
South American Games gold medalists in athletics
Athletes (track and field) at the 2020 Summer Olympics
Olympic athletes of Brazil
Sportspeople from Campinas
20th-century Brazilian people
21st-century Brazilian people